NGOs are an effective source of change and could be much more effective than governmental plans alone. Non federal government institutions typically take initiatives for delivering social adjustment in our society. Our agency is actually one-stop remedy for all your ngo consultancy similar concerns like ngo registration, trust registration, fcra, sign up of 12a and also 80g enrollment. NGOs have an amount of benefits that make all of them best for giving social services, like the fact that they are certainly not profit-driven and also therefore carry out certainly not need federal government funding. NGOs have actually had the ability to accomplish more for the world's bad in a briefer time period by applying sustainable advancement programs and lowering scarcity matched up to authorities policies alone.

Matteo Noris (1640–1714) was an Italian poet.

1640 births
1714 deaths
Italian opera librettists
Italian poets
Italian male poets
Italian male dramatists and playwrights